The first USS Rowan (Torpedo Boat No. 8/TB-8) was a torpedo boat in the United States Navy during the Spanish–American War. She was named for Vice Admiral Stephen Rowan.

Rowan was laid down on 22 June 1896 by Moran Brothers Company, Seattle, Washington; launched 8 April 1898; sponsored by Mrs. Edward Moale, Jr.; and commissioned on 1 April 1899, Lieutenant Reginald F. Nicholson in command. After trials in Puget Sound, Rowan was decommissioned on 1 May 1899.

Rowan was recommissioned on 23 April 1908 and on 21 June she departed Bremerton, Washington, for Mare Island Navy Yard in Vallejo, California. For the next year she cruised off the United States West Coast, from the Canada–US border to Magdalena Bay, Mexico, as a unit of the 3rd Torpedo Flotilla. Then assigned to the Reserve Torpedo Group at Mare Island, she resumed operations with the torpedo flotilla in December 1909 and continued that duty until 1912.

Rowan was decommissioned at Mare Island on 28 October 1912. Her name was struck from the Navy list the following day and her hulk was sold for scrap on 3 June 1918.

References 

 
 Additional technical data from

External links 
 
 
 history.navy.mil: USS Rowan

 

Torpedo boats of the United States Navy
Ships built in Seattle
1898 ships